Chalcides levitoni, commonly called Leviton's cylindrical skink, is a species of lizard in the family Scincidae. The species is endemic to Saudi Arabia.

Geographic range
C. levitoni is found in  Jizan Province, Saudi Arabia.

Etymology
The specific name, levitoni, is in honor of American herpetologist Alan E. Leviton (born 1930), who is an expert on the herpetofauna of the Arabian Peninsula.

Reproduction
Chalcides levitoni is viviparous.

References

Further reading
Pasteur G (1978). "Notes sur les Sauriens du Genre Chalcides III. Description de Chalcides levitoni n. sp.,  d'Arabie Saoudite (Reptilie, Lacertilia, Scincidae)". Journal of Herpetology 12 (3): 371–372. (Chalcides levitoni, new species). (in French).

levitoni
Reptiles of the Arabian Peninsula
Reptiles described in 1978
Endemic fauna of Saudi Arabia
Taxa named by Georges Pasteur